The foreign policy of Lebanon reflects its geographic location, the composition of its population, and its reliance on commerce and trade. Until 2005, Lebanon's foreign policy had been heavily influenced by Syria.  The framework for relations was first codified in May 1991, when Lebanon and Syria signed a treaty of mutual cooperation. This treaty came out of the Taif Agreement, which stipulated that "Lebanon is linked to Syria by distinctive ties deriving strength from kinship, history, and common interests." The Lebanese-Syria treaty calls for "coordination and cooperation between the two countries" that would serve the "interests of the two countries within the framework of sovereignty and independence of each." Numerous agreements on political, economic, and security. After Syria's military withdrawal in 2005, Lebanon's foreign policy charted a more independent course.

Bilateral relations

Africa

Americas

Asia

Europe
Lebanon concluded negotiations on an association agreement with the European Union in late 2001, and both sides initialed the accord in January 2002, the accord becoming known as the EU-Lebanon Association Agreement. The EU-Lebanon Action Plan from January 19, 2007, gave a new impetus to bilateral relations in the framework of the European Neighborhood Policy.

Lebanon is one of the main Mediterranean beneficiaries of community assistance and the EU through its various instruments is Lebanon's leading donor. Starting from 2007 financial support is channeled through the European Neighborhood Policy Instrument. A Lebanon Country Strategy Paper 2007–2013 and a National Indicative Program 2007–2010 have been adopted by the EU. The assistance provided was refocused after the Second Lebanon War to engage in real help for the government and the society in reconstruction and reform of the country.

Oceania

See also 

Constitution of Lebanon
Lebanese diaspora
Lebanese identity card
Lebanese nationality law
Lebanese passport
List of diplomatic missions in Lebanon
List of diplomatic missions of Lebanon
Politics of Lebanon
Visa policy of Lebanon
Visa requirements for Lebanese citizens

References and footnotes

External links
1983 Israel-Lebanon agreement
Embassy of Lebanon in Washington DC
Amb. Farid Abboud profile The Washington Diplomat serves the diplomatic community with columns focusing on international news and events.
 EU Neighbourhood Info Centre: Country profile of Jordan 
Representations of foreign nations in Lebanon 
Delegation of the European Commission in Lebanon
United States Embassy in Beirut, Lebanon
Farid Abboud: Lebanese Ambassador to Tunisia